Charles Robert Francis (May 19, 1875 – July 15, 1946) was a Marine who received the Medal of Honor for actions on June 21, 1900, near Tientsin, China during the Boxer Rebellion.

Francis was born in Doylestown, Pennsylvania, and was a Private. He later obtained the rank of Sergeant Major. Sergeant Major Francis is buried at Hollywood Forever Cemetery.

Medal of Honor citation
Francis, Charles Robert, Private, U.S. Marine Corps, G.O. Navy Department, No.55, July 19, 1901

Citation:

In the presence of the enemy during the battle near Tientsin, China, 21 June 1900, Francis distinguished himself by meritorious conduct.

See also
List of Medal of Honor recipients

Notes

References

United States Marines
1875 births
1946 deaths
United States Marine Corps Medal of Honor recipients
People from Doylestown, Pennsylvania
American military personnel of the Boxer Rebellion
Boxer Rebellion recipients of the Medal of Honor
Burials at Hollywood Forever Cemetery